"My Baby" is a single by Hungarian artist Kállay Saunders. It was released as a single 8 August 2012 for digital download in the Hungary. My Baby was a top contender for the Hungarian Eurovision A Dal qualifiers.

Music video
A music video to accompany the release of "My Baby" was first released digitally on 8 February 2013 at a total length of two minutes and fifty nine seconds.

Eurovision A Dal
My Baby was a top contender for Hungary in the Eurovision Song Contest 2013, ending up as the runner-up in the Hungarian qualifiers.

Chart performance
"My Baby" debuted at number 3 on the Hungarian charts on 4 November 2012. The song peaked the MAHASZ Top 40 Radio Charts at number one.

Weekly charts

Year-end charts

Track listings
 Digital download
 "My Baby" – 2:59

Credits and personnel
 Vocals – Kállay Saunders,
 Producer – Krisztián Burai, Ernő Bodóczki, Leslie Tay, John Alexis
 Lyrics – Kállay Saunders, Leslie Tay
 Label: Today Is Vintage

Release history

References

2012 singles
Number-one singles in Hungary